Tinley Park High School, TPHS or simply Tinley is a public high school located in Tinley Park, Illinois, approximately 30 miles southwest of Chicago. It is part of Bremen Community High School District 228 which also includes Oak Forest High School, Hillcrest High School and Bremen High School.

Overview
Tinley Park High School is the second oldest school of the four high schools comprising Bremen High School District 228, opening in 1961. The 1,100 students at TPHS come from sections of the villages of Tinley Park, Oak Forest, Markham, and Country Club Hills, Illinois.

Demographics
With approximately 67 teachers for the estimated 1100 student body, Tinley Park has a student/teacher ratio of roughly 17:1. In 2007, the student body composed of 56.8% caucasian students, 25.8% African-American students, 10.4% Hispanic students, 4.7% Asian-American students, 0.6% Native American students, and 1.6% multi-racial students.

Academics
In 2016, the average composite ACT score for Titan students was 19.0. As of 2008, Tinley Park HS is making Adequate Yearly Progress (AYP) as described by the federal No Child Left Behind act.

Athletics
Tinley Park's athletic teams play in the South Suburban Conference, governed by the Illinois High School Association (IHSA).

The school sponsors interscholastic teams for young men and women in: basketball, bowling,  cross country, golf, soccer, swimming & diving, tennis, and track & field. Young men may compete in baseball, football, and wrestling. Young women may compete in cheerleading, softball, and volleyball. While not sponsored by the IHSA, the school also sponsors a pom pom team (the Titanette Dancers).

The following teams have won or placed top four in their respective IHSA state tournaments or meets:

 Cheerleading: State Champions (2006–07, 2007–08)
 Chess: 3rd Place (1981-82)
 Football: State Champions (1986–87)
 Group Interpretation: 3rd Place (1987-88)
 Softball: 3rd Place (2012-13)
 Tennis (Girls): 3rd Place (1972-73)
 Wrestling: 3rd Place (1969-70)

Activities

 The Arts
 Art Club
 Art and Anime
 Band / Chorus
 Color Guard
 Drama Club
 Lighting & Staging
 Speech Team
 Publications
 Literary Magazine (Afterthoughts)
 School Newspaper (Titan Times)
 Yearbook (Scythe)
 Service Organizations
 Interact
 Key Club
 Social Interaction Organizations
 Book Club
 Operation Snowball
 Peer Mediation
 Seekers
 Mock Trial
 Gamer's Club

 Athletic Organizations
 Cheerleaders
 Junior / Senior Leadership
 Pom Poms
 Academic Clubs
 ATP (Academic / Talented Program)
 Chess Club
 Energy Club
 French Club
 Mathletes
 Scholastic Bowl
 Science Club
 Spanish Club
 Career Associations
 BPA - Business Professionals of America
 DECA - Distributive Education Clubs of America
 FCCLA - Family, Careers and Community Leaders of America
 ICE - Interrelated Cooperative Education / Skills USA

Notable people 
 Garry Meier, radio personality, 1968
 Ron Gora was a physical education teacher and swimming coach.  He competed in swimming at the 1952 Summer Olympics.
 Denise Richards, American actress, freshman year

References 

Educational institutions established in 1961
Public high schools in Cook County, Illinois
Tinley Park, Illinois
1961 establishments in Illinois